Mandeville High School is a public high school located in Mandeville, Louisiana, United States, a suburban city located thirty miles north of New Orleans. It is part of the St. Tammany Parish Public Schools system.

Mandeville High School is a coeducational, public high school enrolling approximately 2,000 students in Grades 9–12. Approximately 70% of its graduates continue their education: 68% going to four year colleges or universities, and 2% going to either two year colleges or other post secondary institutions.

There are more than 120 members on the professional staff, 58 of whom have a master's degree or higher. MHS was named a Blue Ribbon school during the school year of 2001–02. In addition to serving most of Mandeville, the school also serves Madisonville.

Athletics
Mandeville High athletics competes in the LHSAA.

Notable alumni
 Jack Cressend, former MLB player (Minnesota Twins, Cleveland Indians)
 Faith Hathaway, murder victim killed by Robert Lee Willie
 Jason Kreis, former MLS star and current coach of MLS New York City Football Club
 Michael Mauti, former NFL player (New Orleans Saints)
 Ian Somerhalder, actor, model, and director 
 John Stirratt, bassist and multi instrumentalist for Uncle Tupelo, Wilco, and The Autumn Defense
 Josh Tickell, Sundance award-winning film director 
 Theo Von, stand-up comedian, television personality, host, and actor 
 Tina Watson (née Thomas), murder victim killed by her husband while scuba diving in Australia in 2003

References

External links
 School website
 Saint Tammany Parish School Board

Public high schools in Louisiana
Schools in St. Tammany Parish, Louisiana